In probability theory and statistics, the half-normal distribution is a special case of the folded normal distribution.

Let  follow an ordinary normal distribution, . Then,  follows a half-normal distribution. Thus, the half-normal distribution is a fold at the mean of an ordinary normal distribution with mean zero.

Properties

Using the  parametrization of the normal distribution, the probability density function (PDF) of the half-normal is given by

 

where .

Alternatively using a scaled precision (inverse of the variance) parametrization (to avoid issues if  is near zero), obtained by setting , the probability density function is given by

 

where .

The cumulative distribution function (CDF) is given by

 

Using the change-of-variables , the CDF can be written as

 
where erf is the error function, a standard function in many mathematical software packages.

The quantile function (or inverse CDF) is written:

The expectation is then given by

 

The variance is given by

 

Since this is proportional to the variance σ2 of X, σ can be seen as a scale parameter of the new distribution.

The differential entropy of the half-normal distribution is exactly one bit less the differential entropy of a zero-mean normal distribution with the same second moment about 0. This can be understood intuitively since the magnitude operator reduces information by one bit (if the probability distribution at its input is even). Alternatively, since a half-normal distribution is always positive, the one bit it would take to record whether a standard normal random variable were positive (say, a 1) or negative (say, a 0) is no longer necessary. Thus,

Applications

The half-normal distribution is commonly utilized as a prior probability distribution for variance parameters in Bayesian inference applications.

Parameter estimation 

Given numbers  drawn from a half-normal distribution, the unknown parameter  of that distribution can be estimated by the method of maximum likelihood, giving

 

The bias is equal to 
 

which yields the bias-corrected maximum likelihood estimator

Related distributions 

 The distribution is a special case of the folded normal distribution with μ = 0.
 It also coincides with a zero-mean normal distribution truncated from below at zero (see truncated normal distribution)
 If Y has a half-normal distribution, then (Y/σ)2 has a chi square distribution with 1 degree of freedom, i.e. Y/σ has a chi distribution with 1 degree of freedom.
 The half-normal distribution is a special case of the generalized gamma distribution with d = 1, p = 2, a = .
 If Y has a half-normal distribution, Y -2 has a Levy distribution
 The Rayleigh  distribution is a moment-tilted and scaled generalization of the half-normal distribution.

See also
 Half-t distribution
 Truncated normal distribution
 Folded normal distribution
 Rectified Gaussian distribution

References

Further reading

External links

Half-Normal Distribution at MathWorld
(note that MathWorld uses the parameter 

Continuous distributions
Normal distribution